Langzhong (formerly known as Paoning) is a county-level city in northeastern Sichuan province, China, located on the middle reaches of the Jialing River. It is administered as part of the prefecture-level city of Nanchong. Langzhong has a total population of 880,000, with 250,000 residing in the urban area.

Langzhong is famous for its historic centre, home to 30,000 of its residents. It is one of the best preserved historic towns of China, dating back to the Tang dynasty. The city was also the seat of the former Anglican Diocese of Szechwan.

History 

The site of present-day Langzhong served for a time as the capital of Ba, a native but sinicized Sichuan state during China's Warring States period. It takes its present name from its role as the seat of Langzhong County, established by Qin two years after its 316 BC conquest of Shu and Ba. Under the Han and Tang, it was an important center for astronomical research. Under the Yuan, Ming, and Qing, it was known as Baoning. Over the late imperial period, it served as Sichuan's provincial capital for a total of ten years. It was well known for its salt wells. Is has also long been an important military town of Sichuan.

Since 1985, the PRC government has awarded Langzhong with various accolades on three separate occasions. In 1986 the State Council named it a famous and historical town. In 1991, it was finally upgraded to county-level city status.

Geography
Langzhong is located in the northeast of the province and the northern part of the Sichuan Basin on the middle reaches of the Jialing River. The area is dominated by low-lying mountains and hills.

Climate
As with much of the rest of the province, Langzhong has a monsoon-influenced humid subtropical climate (Köppen Cwa), with dry, temperate winters, and long, hot, humid summers. The frost-free period lasts 290 days per year, while annual sunshine amounts to 1,400 hours. Close to two-thirds of the annual rainfall occurs from June to September.

Administrative divisions

Transport
China National Highway 212

Notes

References

Sources

County-level cities in Sichuan
Nanchong